Crockerella is a genus of sea snails, marine gastropod mollusks in the family Clathurellidae.

Species
Species within the genus Crockerella include:
 Crockerella castianira (Dall, 1919)
 Crockerella conradiana (Gabb, 1869)
 Crockerella constricta (Gabb, 1865)
 Crockerella crystallina (Gabb, 1865)
 Crockerella cymodoce (Dall, 1919)
 Crockerella eriphyle (Dall, 1919)
 Crockerella evadne (Dall, 1919)
 Crockerella lowei (Dall, 1903)
 Crockerella philodice (Dall, 1919)
 Crockerella scotti McLean, 1996
 Crockerella toreumata (Dall, W.H., 1889)
 Crockerella tridesmia (Berry, 1941)
Species brought into synonymy
 Crockerella hesione (Dall, 1919): synonym of Crockerella lowei (Dall, 1903)
 Crockerella pederseni Hertlein, L.G. & A.M. Strong, 1951: synonym of Pyrgocythara danae (Dall, 1919) 
 Crockerella philodoce (Dall, 1919): synonym of Crockerella philodice (Dall, 1919)

References

 McLean J.H. (1996). The Prosobranchia. In: Taxonomic Atlas of the Benthic Fauna of the Santa Maria Basin and Western Santa Barbara Channel. The Mollusca Part 2 – The Gastropoda. Santa Barbara Museum of Natural History. volume 9: 1-160

External links
 

 
Gastropod genera